Utrivalva is a genus of moths belonging to the family Tortricidae.

Species
Utrivalva melitocrossa Meyrick, 1926 
Utrivalva usurpata Razowski, 1987

References

 , 1987, Bull. Acad. Pol. Sci., Sr. Sci. Biol. 35: 67.
 , 2005, World Catalogue of Insects volume 5 Tortricidae

External links
tortricidae.com

Chlidanotini
Tortricidae genera
Taxa named by Józef Razowski